Brownstown is an unincorporated community in Wyandot County in the U.S. state of Ohio.

History
Brownstown was laid out by one Mr. Brown, a pioneer who arrived in the 1830s.

References

Unincorporated communities in Wyandot County, Ohio
Unincorporated communities in Ohio
1830s establishments in Ohio